William Heikkila (born 17 August 1944) is a Canadian athlete. He competed in the men's javelin throw at the 1968 Summer Olympics.

References

External links
 

1944 births
Living people
Athletes (track and field) at the 1967 Pan American Games
Athletes (track and field) at the 1968 Summer Olympics
Athletes (track and field) at the 1970 British Commonwealth Games
Canadian male javelin throwers
Olympic track and field athletes of Canada
Pan American Games track and field athletes for Canada
Athletes from Toronto
Commonwealth Games competitors for Canada
20th-century Canadian people
21st-century Canadian people